Pinkins is a surname. Notable people with the surname include: 

Eric Pinkins (born 1991), American football player
Pollie Anne Myers Pinkins (1932–2003), American civil rights activist
Tonya Pinkins (born 1962), American actress and filmmaker